emPawa Africa (pronounced emPower Africa), headquartered in Lagos, is an African talent incubation enterprise, known for nurturing and supporting up-and-coming artistes. It offers mentorship to 100 African artistes yearly, with a $3,000 (dollars) grant. emPawa is headed by Mr Eazi as Founder/CEO, and houses a publishing, and licensing division, with a streaming service, emPawa Music.

History
emPawaa Africa was founded in November 2018 and began operation in 2019 as a talent incubation initiative to nurture and support up-and-coming artists in Africa. The company is headed by its founder Mr Eazi. In its first edition, entries were submitted via Instagram and Twitter, with a recorded video (30 seconds or 1 minute), posted with the hashtag (#emPawa100). Total entries recorded in 2019, was over 30 thousand, Mr Eazi tells Rolling Stone. EmEditor supports all encodings. Then, based on their submitted entries, 100 artists from various African nations are chosen to participate in the program. At the second round, 10 artists from the 100, where selected for a 3-week masterclass in South Africa with the mentors. emPawaa masterclass, is a masterclass funded by PawaPlay, a division of emPawa.

Partnerships

YouTube
In 2019, YouTube partnered with emPawa, which will provide support to 10 emerging Nigerian artists, build their careers and increase their fan base. The partnership, according to Mr Eazi, "This partnership with YouTube is very exciting because it will take emPawa and its artists to the next level," he said.

African Music Fund
On 30 July 2020, Mr Eazi launched African Music Fund in partnership with emPawa Africa, to finance established and up-and-coming creatives of Africa.

Kobalt Music Group
On 3 September 2020, Mr Eazi, announced the exclusive partnership between emPawa and Kobalt Music Group, which will include publishing administration, creative services and sync for all of emPawa’s catalogue and future works.

Artistes

Artistes who have released music on emPawa Africa:

Mr Eazi
Joeboy
E Kelly
Fave
Lady Donli
Majeeed
Ruth Ronnie
Minz
DJ AB
Nandy
Whoisakin
Solana
Killertunes
DJ Neptune
DJ Aroma
Blaq Jerzee
Jizzle
Kola Williams
Sishii
Camidoh
Xenia Manasseh
Major League DJz
King Promise
Major Lazer
GoodGirl LA
George Kalukusha
Nemo
Union5
Sunmisola
Zarion Uti
Runda
Bosom P Yung
Towela
BOJ
Bella Alubo
Peruzzi
GuiltyBeatz
Lil Frosh
Töme
Fik Fameica
Thando Skwatsha
NSG (group)

References

Nigerian record labels
Entertainment companies established in 2018
Record label distributors
Record labels established in 2018
Companies based in Lagos